The Bahrain Defence Force (BDF) is the military force of the Kingdom of Bahrain. The Bahrain Defence Force is under direct command and leadership of a commander-in-chief who holds the rank of field marshal. The Government has a Minister of Defence Affairs responsible of BDF representation in the Cabinet.

It numbers about 18,000 personnel and consists of the Royal Bahraini Air Force, Royal Bahraini Army, Royal Bahraini Navy and the Royal Guard. Apart from the BDF, the public security forces and the Coast Guard report to the Ministry of Interior.

In January 2008, the Crown Prince, Salman bin Hamad bin Isa Al Khalifa was appointed as the Deputy Supreme Commander, while Khalifa bin Ahmed Al Khalifa was appointed Commander-in-Chief of the BDF. BDF's Chief of Staff is Lieutenant General Theyab bin Saqer Al Noaimi.

GCC support

Bahrain, in conjunction with its GCC partners has moved to upgrade its defenses in response to the threat posed by the Iran-Iraq and Persian Gulf wars.

In 1982, the GCC gave Bahrain $1.7 billion to help improve its defenses. Bahrain's defense spending since 1999 has been steady. The government spends around $320 million annually on their military.

U.S. support

After the Gulf War, Bahrain received additional military support from the United States, including the sale of 54 M60A3 tanks, 12 F-16C/D aircraft, and 14 Cobra helicopters. Joint naval, air and military exercises also have been planned and executed to increase readiness throughout the Persian Gulf. Bahrain and the United States signed a Defense Cooperation Agreement in October 1991, granting U.S. forces access to Bahraini facilities and ensuring the right to pre-position material for future crises. In 2003, George W. Bush designated Bahrain as a major non-NATO ally of the United States. Since 2003, Bahrain has been granted over $100 million in Foreign Military Funding to pay for various high-profile weapons systems, to include an AN/TPS-59(v)3B Early Warning Radar, Large Aircraft Infrared Countermeasures (LAIRCM), Air-to-Air Missile Avoidance System for the King's Plane (Boeing 747-400), as well as an Avenger Air Defense Vehicle.

Commanders-in-Chief of the BDF

See also
 National Guard (Bahrain)
 Special Security Force Command

References

External links 

 Official site
Background Note: Bahrain - Defense U.S. Department of State